Le Sueur-Henderson Secondary School is a public school located in Le Sueur, Minnesota. The school serves both communities of Le Sueur and Henderson, Minnesota for grades 6–12. This adds up to a student body of 537 students, 234 enrolled in middle school (grades 6–8), and 303 in high school (grades 9–12).

School system

The Le Sueur-Henderson School System consists of Park Elementary School and Le Sueur-Henderson Secondary School in Le Sueur and Hilltop Elementary School in Henderson.
Each of these schools service their own division of the system from (Kindergarten-12th grade). Park Elementary School serves Kindergarten-3rd grade; Hilltop serves 4th–5th grade; Le Sueur-Henderson Secondary School serves 6th–12th grade.

History

The establishment that is now Le Sueur-Henderson Secondary School was founded in 1885. However before its merger, the current establishment was simply named Le Sueur Secondary School.
Henderson High School had fully existed as an independent high school until 1986 when it had merged its athletics, Henderson Tigers, with nearby Arlington-Green Isle, Sibley East Bengals. This had marked the beginning of Henderson’s loss of independence as in 1990 they had joined to form Le Sueur-Henderson School District and finally, in 1992, Henderson High School closed and consolidated with Le Sueur Secondary School forming the current Le Sueur-Henderson Secondary School.

References

Schools in Le Sueur County, Minnesota
Schools in Sibley County, Minnesota